Phosphatidylinositol 3-phosphate (PtdIns3P) is a phospholipid found in cell membranes that helps to recruit a range of proteins, many of which are involved in protein trafficking, to the membranes. It is the product of both the class II and III phosphoinositide 3-kinases (PI 3-kinases) activity on phosphatidylinositol.

PtdIns3P is dephosphorylated by the myotubularin family of phosphatases, on the D3 position of the inositol ring, and can be converted to PtdIns(3,5)P2 by the lipid kinase PIKfyve.

Both FYVE domains and PX domains – found in proteins such as SNX1, HGS, and EEA1 – bind to PtdIns3P.

The majority of PtdIns3P appears to be constitutively synthesised by the class III PI 3-kinase, PIK3C3 (Vps34), at endocytic membranes. Class II PI 3-kinases also appear to synthesise PtdIns3P, their activity however appears to be regulated by a range of stimuli, including growth factors. This suggests that specific pools of PtdIns3P may be synthesised upon cell stimulation.

See also 

 Phosphatidylinositol 3-phosphate-binding protein 2

References 

Phospholipids